David MacMillan is an American sound engineer. He has won three Academy Awards for Best Sound. He has worked on over 70 films since 1973.

Selected filmography
 The Right Stuff (1983)
 Speed (1994)
 Apollo 13 (1995)

References

External links

Year of birth missing (living people)
Living people
American audio engineers
Best Sound Mixing Academy Award winners
Best Sound BAFTA Award winners